Nosivka Raion  was a raion (district) of Chernihiv Oblast, northern Ukraine. Its administrative centre was located at the city of Nosivka. The raion was abolished on 18 July 2020 as part of the administrative reform of Ukraine, which reduced the number of raions of Chernihiv Oblast to five. The area of Nosivka Raion was merged into Nizhyn Raion. The last estimate of the raion population was 

At the time of disestablishment, the raion consisted of three hromadas:
 Makiivka rural hromada with the administration in the selo of Makiivka;
 Mryn rural hromada with the administration in the selo of Mryn;
 Nosivka urban hromada with the administration in Nosivka.

References

External links 
 https://wikinosivka.info Wiki Encyclopedia of Nosivka Raion

Former raions of Chernihiv Oblast
1923 establishments in Ukraine
Ukrainian raions abolished during the 2020 administrative reform